The World Police Indoor Soccer Tournament is an international futsal tournament for police officers. This contest takes place every year in Eibergen, Groenlo and Zieuwent in the Netherlands. Those cities are near the border with Germany. In the early 1980s the Eibergen Police department took the initiative to have a tournament with their German colleagues, to improve their cooperation. The tournament grew to be a European, and later a worldwide event. In this moment it is the greatest police indoor soccer tournament in the world.

The 2013 (31st) tournament will be held in Eibergen, Groenlo, Lichtenvoorde and Zieuwent in the Netherlands. About 2900 policemen and policewomen from 50 countries and 190 teams will participate in a men's, men's 35+, and women's tournament. This tournament will be held from 7 to 11 October 2013.

See also
World Corporate Games
World Company Games
European Company Games
World Firefighters Games
World Military Games
World Police and Fire Games

References

External links
 World Police Indoor Soccer Tournament 

International futsal competitions
Sports competitions in Gelderland
Sport in Berkelland
Sport in Oost Gelre